Dilham is a village and civil parish in the English county of Norfolk. The village is located 4.3 miles south-east of North Walsham and 12 miles north-east of Norwich, and is situated on the River Ant.

History
Dilham's name is of Anglo-Saxon origin and derives from the Old English for a farmstead or homestead with an abundance of dill.

In the Domesday Book, Dilham is listed as a settlement of 23 households in the hundred of Tunstead. The village was divided between the estates of Alan of Brittany, Robert Malet, Roger Bigod and St Benet's Abbey.

Nearby Dilham Castle was built in the Fifteenth Century as a fortified manor house for Sir Henry Inglose, all that remains of the castle is the Grade II listed tower currently attached to Hall Farm.

Geography
According to the 2011 Census, Dilham Parish has a population of 319 residents living in 164 households.

Dilham falls within the constituency of North Norfolk and is represented at Parliament by Duncan Baker MP of the Conservative Party.

Dilham marks the limit of Broads navigation for larger boats, but smaller boats can continue on the North Walsham & Dilham Canal until Honing.

St. Nicholas' Church
Dilham's parish church was almost entirely rebuilt in the Twentieth Century, with the ruins of an Anglo-Saxon round-tower church attached. Despite this, the Medieval font and organ remain.

War Memorial
Dilham's war memorial takes the form of two carved marble plaques inside St. Nicholas' Church. The memorial lists the following names of the fallen for the First World War:
 Lieutenant William J. Faulke (d.1918), 9th Battalion, Royal Norfolk Regiment
 Lance-Corporal Harold Fiske (1893-1918), 2nd Battalion, Essex Regiment
 Private Frederick W. Durrant (1892-1917), 7th Battalion, Border Regiment
 Private Arthur Morter (1886-1915), 1st Battalion, Essex Regiment
 Private Sidney Morter (1887-1915), 1st Battalion, Essex Regiment
 Private Lawson J. Dewing (1898-1919), 429th (Agricultural) Company, Labour Corps

And, the following for the Second World War:
 Bombardier Gilbert Hannant (1882-1942), 1st Regiment, Royal Horse Artillery
 Gunner Bertie W. Mortimer (1920-1944), 72nd (Anti-Tank) Regiment, Royal Artillery
 Private Basil A. Golder (1917-1942), 4th Battalion, Royal Norfolk Regiment
 Private Sidney H. Fiske (1918-1942), 6th Battalion, Royal Norfolk Regiment
 Private Alexander B. Simpson (1915-1940), 7th Battalion, Royal Norfolk Regiment

References

External links

Villages in Norfolk
Civil parishes in Norfolk
North Norfolk